Marie Hanfstängl (30 April 1848, in Breslau – 5 September 1917, in Munich), born Marie Schroeder (or Schröder), was a notable German operatic soprano singer and singing teacher, whose career was mostly conducted in Germany.

Marie Schröder was a pupil of Pauline Viardot's in Baden-Baden. She appeared at the Théâtre Lyrique in Paris in 1866, but returned to Germany on the outbreak of war in 1870. In 1871 she was engaged by the Court Opera House at Stuttgart.

After marrying Erwin Hanfstaengl, a member of the distinguished Stuttgart photographer and art-publishing family headed by Franz Hanfstaengl, Marie resumed her musical studies in 1878, going to Vannucini in Florence, and thereafter was employed by the Stadt-Theater at Frankfurt. She sang at the Metropolitan Opera as Marie Schröder-Hanfstängl during the 1884–85 and 1888–89 seasons. In 1895 she became a teacher of singing at the Hoch Conservatory in the same city, where one of her students was Margarete Dessoff. She retired in 1897, and spent her final years in Munich.

The beautiful, exquisitely trained voice, and the polished virtuosity of her delivery made her an outstanding coloratura singer. Among her best roles were: Rosina (The Barber of Seville), Gretchen (in Gounod's Faust), Amina (La sonnambula), Philine (Mignon), Lucia, Martha etc.

Writings 
 Meine Lehrweise der Gesangskunst und Elementartheorie in Wort und Bild (My System of Teaching Singing). London, etc.: Schott & Co, 1902.

Sources 

 Meyers, Konversations-Lexikon (1888–1890).
 A. Eaglefield-Hull, A Dictionary of Modern Music and Musicians (Dent, London 1924).
 Peter Cahn: Das Hoch'sche Konservatorium in Frankfurt am Main (1878–1978), Frankfurt am Main: Kramer, 1979.

 

1848 births
1917 deaths
German operatic sopranos
Academic staff of Hoch Conservatory
German women academics
19th-century German women opera singers
Musicians from Wrocław